Climate change in Virginia encompasses the effects of climate change, attributed to man-made increases in atmospheric carbon dioxide, in the U.S. state of Virginia.

The United States Environmental Protection Agency reports:

"Virginia's climate is changing. Most of the state has warmed about one degree (F) in the last century, and the sea is rising one to two inches every decade. Higher water levels are eroding beaches, submerging low lands, exacerbating coastal flooding, and increasing the salinity of estuaries and aquifers. The southeastern United States has warmed less than most of the nation. But in the coming decades, the region's changing climate is likely to reduce crop yields, harm livestock, increase the number of unpleasantly hot days, and increase the risk of heat stroke and other heat-related illnesses".

Climate policy in Virginia

Several local communities have enacted plans to limit the effects of climate change. In the wake of Hurricane Matthew and the flooding of over 2000 homes, the city of Virginia Beach took an unusual and aggressive stance on some new floodplain developments. The city rejected plans for building in the floodplain by large developers. The subsequent lawsuit and legal judgment may result in far-reaching consequences for future local climate change adaptation. After the developers took the city to court over the rejected plans, the courts ruled the city's actions acceptable. This makes future land buybacks and risky development project rejection more palatable from a legal perspective in the future.

After Hurricane Matthew, Norfolk purchased land from 18 landowners whose homes were destroyed in the hurricane. Some community-members and developers in Norfolk expressed similar concerns about tax base and growth as were discussed in Virginia Beach and elsewhere regarding retreat.

Observed effects of climate change

"Tropical storms and hurricanes have become more intense during the past 20 years. Although warming oceans provide these storms with more potential energy, scientists are not sure whether the recent intensification reflects a long-term trend. Nevertheless, hurricane wind speeds and rainfall rates are likely to increase as the climate continues to warm".

In June 2019, it was reported that climate change was already having an effect on local fishing industries, causing declines in some fish populations that had long been found in Virginia waters.

Projected effects of climate change

"Seventy years from now, temperatures are likely to rise above 95°F approximately 20 to 40 days per year in the southeastern half of Virginia, compared with about 10 days per year today. Warmer temperatures will increase the use of air-conditioning, which will increase electricity consumption".

"Sea level is rising more rapidly along Virginia’s shores than in most coastal areas because the land is sinking. If the oceans and atmosphere continue to warm, sea level along the Virginia coast is likely to rise sixteen inches to four feet in the next century".

"As sea level rises, the lowest dry lands are submerged and become either tidal wetland or open water. The freshwater wetlands in the upper tidal portions of the Potomac, Rappahannock, York, and James rivers build their own land by capturing floating sediments, and they are likely to keep pace with the rising sea during the next century. But most salt marshes along the brackish portions of those rivers and along Chesapeake Bay are unlikely to keep pace if sea level rises three feet. The wetlands of Back Bay and the North Landing River are even more vulnerable and may be lost if the sea rises two feet. Beaches also erode as sea level rises. A higher ocean level makes it more likely that storm waters will wash over a barrier island or open new inlets. The United States Geological Survey estimates that  Virginia's barrier islands could be broken up by new inlets or lost to erosion if sea level rises two feet by the year 2100. Beach erosion will threaten the oceanfront portion of Virginia Beach, unless people take measures to offset the erosion. Rising sea level also threatens bay beaches and tidal flats".

"As sea level rises, salt water can mix farther inland or upstream in bays, rivers, and wetlands. Because water on the surface is connected to ground water, salt water can also intrude into aquifers near the coast. Soils may become too salty for farms or forests. For example, some of the freshwater swamps along the York River’s tidal tributaries have standing dead trees that were killed by saltwater intrusion made possible by rising sea level".

"Whether or not storms become more intense, coastal homes and infrastructure will flood more often as sea level rises, because storm surges will become higher as well. Many roads, railways, and ports are vulnerable to the impacts of storms and sea level rise, and most of the heavily populated Hampton Roads area could be flooded by a major hurricane. Poquoson and a few other communities along Chesapeake Bay are so low that water in roadside ditches rises and falls with the tides. As sea level rises and storms possibly become more severe, homes and infrastructure in these communities will flood more frequently. As a result, rising sea level is likely to increase flood insurance rates, while more frequent storms could increase the deductible for wind damage in homeowner insurance policies".

"Increased rainfall could further exacerbate flooding in both coastal and inland areas. The amount of precipitation during very heavy storms increased by 27 percent between 1958 and 2012 in the Southeast, and the trend toward increasingly severe rainstorms is likely to continue".

Coastal ecosystems

"The loss of tidal marshes could harm fish and birds that depend on a marsh for food or shelter. Marine organisms and small insects that feed in marshes are key sources of food for crabs, rockfish, and other commercially important fisheries. Striped bass, bluefish, sea trout, and summer flounder move into and out of marshes for food and shelter. Many birds inhabit the most vulnerable marshes along Chesapeake Bay, including great blue heron, bald eagle, American black duck, and snowy egret. Marshes along the Atlantic coast provide forage for shorebirds, such as sandpipers and plovers, and several species of ducks and geese spend the winter in these marshes".

"The loss of bay beaches would remove key habitat for diamondback terrapin, which nest on these beaches. Other species that depend on bay beaches include horseshoe crabs, tiger beetles, sand fleas, snails, and several crab species. The loss of those species would remove important sources of food for birds. Changing temperatures could also disrupt ecosystems. If water temperatures exceed 86°F during summer, eelgrass could be lost, which would remove habitat for summer flounder, blue crab, and bay scallop. Brants, canvasback ducks, and American black ducks would also lose a food source".

Agriculture

"Changing the climate will have both harmful and beneficial effects on farming. Higher temperatures are likely to reduce livestock productivity, because heat stress disrupts the animals' metabolism. In the next few decades, hotter summers are likely to reduce yields of corn. But higher concentrations of atmospheric carbon dioxide increase crop yields, and that fertilizing effect is likely to offset the harmful effects of heat on cotton, soybeans, wheat, and peanuts—assuming that adequate water is available. Rising temperatures are likely to increase the need for irrigation, and where water is scarce, increasingly severe droughts are likely to reduce crop yields".

See also
 Plug-in electric vehicles in Virginia

References

Further reading 

 —this chapter of the National Climate Assessment covers Southeast states (Virginia, West Virginia, North Carolina, South Carolina, Florida, Georgia, Alabama, Tennessee, Arkansas, Louisiana).

Virginia